American singer Jordin Sparks has released four studio albums, four extended plays, one mixtape, 25 singles (including two as a featured artist, fourteen promotional singles and one charity single), 14 soundtrack appearances and seventeen music videos. At the age of 17, Sparks won the sixth season of American Idol in 2007 and earned a record deal with Jive Records. She made her chart debut with the season's coronation song, "This Is My Now", which peaked at number 15 on the US Billboard Hot 100 chart.

Sparks' self-titled debut studio album was released in November 2007. The album debuted at number 10 on the US Billboard 200 chart, and was eventually certified platinum by the Recording Industry Association of America (RIAA). "Tattoo" and "No Air" were released as the album's first and second singles, respectively. Both songs reached the top 10 of the Billboard Hot 100 and received platinum certifications. "One Step at a Time" was released as the third single, and became a top 20 song in multiple countries worldwide. As of November 2010, Jordin Sparks has sold two million copies worldwide.

Sparks' second studio album Battlefield was released in July 2009. The album debuted at number seven on the Billboard 200, and was notably unsuccessful compared to Sparks' debut, only selling 190,000 copies in the US as of July 2015. Three singles were released from the album: "Battlefield", "S.O.S. (Let the Music Play)" and "Don't Let It Go to Your Head". The title track reached the top 10 in multiple countries and received gold and platinum certifications in Australia and New Zealand. In November 2009, Sparks was featured on the Guy Sebastian single "Art of Love", which charted within the top 10 in Australia and New Zealand. Sparks' third studio album Right Here Right Now was released on August 21, 2015.

Albums

Studio albums

Mixtapes

Extended plays

Singles

As lead artist

As featured artist

Promotional singles

Charity singles

Other charted songs

Other appearances

Album appearances

Soundtrack appearances

Music videos

Notes

References

External links
 

Discography
American Idol discographies
Discographies of American artists
Pop music discographies
Rhythm and blues discographies